The Dwarf Lulu is a breed of cattle that is native to the mountains of Central Asia. It has taurine, yak and zebu cattle genetics.

Cows weigh between 68 and 153 kg, which makes the Dwarf Lulu the presumably smallest cattle breed known.

References

Bovid hybrids
Cattle breeds